Poliaenus obscurus is a species of beetle in the family Cerambycidae. It was described by Fall in 1910.

Subspecies
 Poliaenus obscurus albidus Linsley, 1933
 Poliaenus obscurus obscurus (Fall, 1910)
 Poliaenus obscurus ponderosae Linsley, 1935
 Poliaenus obscurus schaefferi Linsley, 1933

References

Pogonocherini
Beetles described in 1910